Bazareh-ye Qarnas (also Romanized as Bāzāreh-ye Qārnās; also known as Bāzāreh and Bāzār) is a village in Atrak Rural District, Maneh District, Maneh and Samalqan County, North Khorasan Province, Iran. At the 2006 census, its population was 1,096, in 280 families.

References 

Populated places in Maneh and Samalqan County